NA-86 Sargodha-V is a constituency for the National Assembly of Pakistan.

Members of Parliament

2002-2018: NA-68 Sargodha-V

2018-2022: NA-92 Sargodha-V

Election 2002 

General elections were held on 10 Oct 2002. Mazhar Ahmed Qureshi  of PML-Q won by 84,038 votes.

Election 2008 

The result of general election 2008 in this constituency is given below.

Result 
Syed Javed Hassnain Shah succeeded in the election 2008 and became the member of National Assembly.

Election 2013 

General elections were held on 11 May 2013. Sardar Muhammad Shafqat Hayat Khan of PML-N won the seat and became the member of National Assembly.

Election 2018 

General elections were held on 25 July 2018.

See also
NA-85 Sargodha-IV
NA-87 Khushab-I

References

External links 
Election result's official website

NA-068